Bernacchi Bay is a bay about  wide between Marble Point and Cape Bernacchi, on the coast of Victoria Land. South Stream brings water from Wilson Piedmont Glacier into the bay. It was named after Louis Charles Bernacchi by the British Antarctic Expedition, 1910–13, under Robert Falcon Scott.

Further reading 
 United States. Defense Mapping Agency. Hydrographic Center, Sailing Directions for Antarctica: Includes Islands South of Latitude 60°, P 243

External links 

 Bernacchi Bay on USGS website
 Bernacchi Bay on the Antarctica New Zealand Digital Asset Manager website
 Bernacchi Bay on AADC website
 Bernacchi Bay on SCAR website
 Bernacchi Bay on marineregions website
 Bernacchi Bay current weather
 Bernacchi Bay long term updated weather forecast
 Bernacchi Bay weather statistics

References 

Bays of Victoria Land
Scott Coast